The Spitzer Berg is a 790.3 m high (above sea level) mountain located in the Thuringian Highland, Thuringia (Germany). 

It is located close to the municipality of Lichte and the Leibis-Lichte Dam in the  Saalfeld-Rudolstadt district in the Thuringian Forest Nature Park within walking distance of the Rennsteig.

See also
 List of Mountains and Elevations of Thuringia

Mountains of Thuringia
Thuringian Forest
Lichte